Torrenticola is a genus of arachnids belonging to the family Torrenticolidae.

The genus has cosmopolitan distribution.

Species:
 Torrenticola acuticoxalis Viets 
 Torrenticola affinis (Lundblad, 1941)

References

Trombidiformes
Trombidiformes genera